Gustav Adolf Tannert (1 November 1875 – 30 January 1961) was a German gymnast. He competed in the men's individual all-around event at the 1900 Summer Olympics.

References

External links

1875 births
1961 deaths
German male artistic gymnasts
Olympic gymnasts of Germany
Gymnasts at the 1900 Summer Olympics
Gymnasts from Berlin